There are three species of amphibians recorded in Cyprus, all of them frogs.

Frogs and toads
Family: Bufonidae
 Bufotes cypriensis Litvinchuk, Mazepa, Jablonski, Dufresnes, 2019 Cyprus Green Toad

Family: Hylidae
 Hyla savignyi (Audouin, 1827) Middle East tree frog
Family: Ranidae
 Pelophylax cypriensis Ploetner, Baier, Akın, Mazepa, Schreiber, Beerli, Litvinchuk, Bilgin, Borkin, Uzzell, 2012 Cyprus water frog (formerly classified as Pelophylax bedriagae Levant water frog)

References

See also
Lists of amphibians by region

Amphibians
Cyprus
Cyprus
Cyprus